Kocaeli Province is a province of Turkey and one of only three not to have the same official name as its capital, İzmit, which is thus also sometimes called Kocaeli. The province is the successor of the Ottoman-era Sanjak of Kocaeli. The largest towns in the province are İzmit and Gebze. The traffic code is 41. The province is located at the easternmost end of the Sea of Marmara around the Gulf of İzmit. Kocaeli is bordered by the province of Istanbul and the Marmara Sea to the west, the Black Sea to the north, the province of Sakarya to the east, the province of Bursa to the south and the province of Yalova to the southwest. The metropolitan area of Istanbul extends to the Kocaeli-Istanbul provincial border.  The size and natural conditions of the Bay of İzmit allow for extensive port facilities, including the Gölcük Naval Base. The province is called the industrial capital of Turkey. Kocaeli has an airport named Cengiz Topel Naval Air Station which is used for military and civilian transport. Kocaeli has two universities: Kocaeli University and Gebze Technical University.

Demographics 

Data taken from Kocaeli Metropolitan Municipality and Central Dissemination System. The information is for (xxxx-12-31).

Districts 

Kocaeli province is divided into 12 districts with the capital district of İzmit (in bold):
 KOCAELİ: 1,722,795
 Derince: 133,739
 Gebze: 338,412
 Gölcük: 149,238 
 İzmit: 338,710
 Kandıra: 49,203
 Karamürsel: 54,225
 Körfez: 146,210
 Kartepe: 104,882
 Başiskele: 79,625
 Çayırova: 109,698
 Dilovası: 45,714
 Darıca: 173,139

Twin cities 
  Kassel, Germany
  Novi Pazar, Serbia

See also 
 East Marmara Region
 Kocaeli University
 Pişmaniye
 Provinces of Turkey

References

External links 

  
 Kocaeli municipality's official website 
 Kocaeli Etkinlik 
 Kocaeli Gazetesi ve Haberleri